12th Rifle Division can refer to:

12th Rifle Division (Soviet Union)
12th Guards Rifle Division
12th Motor Rifle Division
12th Siberian Rifle Division